Back to Higher Ground is the third album by The Briggs, released on September 12, 2006.

Track listing

All songs written by Joey LaRocca and Jason LaRocca. 
"Back to Higher Ground" – 2:46
"Let Them Know" – 3:06
"Song of Babylon" – 2:24
"Common & Unknown" – 3:13
"Maritime Tragedies" – 3:27
"Everyone's an Actor" – 3:29
"Wasting Time" – 2:27
"Insane" – 3:36
"My Own Enemy" – 2:33
"Harder to Stand" – 3:07
"Blacklist" – 3:14
"Don't Care" – 2:54

References

The Briggs albums
2006 albums
SideOneDummy Records albums